Neil Pollock (born 25 August 1955) is a New Zealand cricketer. He played in seven first-class and three List A matches for Northern Districts from 1981 to 1987.

See also
 List of Northern Districts representative cricketers

References

External links
 

1955 births
Living people
New Zealand cricketers
Northern Districts cricketers
People from Pukekohe